Anne Distel (born Anne Dayez on 19 February 1947) is a French honorary general curator of heritage at the Musée d'Orsay and specialist in Impressionist paintings. She curated notable exhibitions such as Large monographie Renoir, Cézanne et Un ami Van Gogh: Le Docteur Gachet, 'and 'Paul Signac (1863-1935) or The Mystery et l'éclat.

 Career 
Anne Distel is professor of art history at Paris-Sorbonne University. She is the author of numerous books on nineteenth-century paintings. She is particularly interested in Pierre-Auguste Renoir, and was the curator of the monographic exhibition of Renoir which was presented at the Grand Palais in Paris in 1985. She organised a lecture, "Renoir and the Woman of Paris", at The Frick Collection art museum in 2012.

She authored  (1993), a lavishly illustrated pocket book for the collection "Découvertes Gallimard", which has been translated into six languages, including English; and Renoir, a 400-page book packaged in a box set, published in English in 2010.

During an interview with Éditions Gallimard, Distel observed that collectors—for example, Albert C. Barnes—played a very important role in Renoir's life, and were the cause of evolution of his style. Barnes built a foundation to house his eclectic private collection in 1922. The foundation had a goal of education consistent with Barnes' very democratic ideas about the spread of culture.

Distel was nominated Commandeur of the Ordre des Arts et des Lettres in 2008.

 Selected publications 
 Impressionism: A Centenary Exhibition, Metropolitan Museum of Art, 1974
 Impressionism: The First Collectors, Harry N. Abrams, Inc., 1990
 Renoir : « Il faut embellir », collection « Découvertes Gallimard » (nº 177), série Arts. Éditions Gallimard, 1993, new edition in 2009
 UK edition – Renoir: A Sensuous Vision, 'New Horizons' series. Thames & Hudson, 1995
 US edition – Renoir: A Sensuous Vision, "Abrams Discoveries" series. Harry N. Abrams, 1995
 Gustave Caillebotte: Urban Impressionist, Abbeville Press, 1995
 Signac, au temps d'harmonie, collection « Découvertes Gallimard » (nº 404), série Arts. Éditions Gallimard, 2001
 Renoir, Abbeville Press, 2010
 In collaboration
 With John House and Lawrence Gowing, Renoir (Renoir Exhibition Catalogue), Harry N. Abrams, Inc., 1985
 With Claire Frèches-Thory, Geniève Lacambre and Sylvie Gache-Patin, Musee d'Orsay: Impressionism and Post-Impressionist Masterpieces, Thames & Hudson, 1993
 With Susan Alyson Stein, Cézanne to Van Gogh: The Collection of Doctor Gachet'', Metropolitan Museum of Art, 1999

References 

1947 births
Living people
French curators
French art critics
French women art critics
Academic staff of the University of Paris
Commandeurs of the Ordre des Arts et des Lettres
French women curators